The William B. Harris House is a historic residence in Zanesville, Ohio, United States.  A Gothic Revival building constructed in 1863, it lies along Newman Drive on the city's eastern side.  In 1978, the house and one related building were listed together on the National Register of Historic Places because of  their historically significant architecture.

References

Houses completed in 1863
Gothic Revival architecture in Ohio
Houses on the National Register of Historic Places in Ohio
Buildings and structures in Zanesville, Ohio
Houses in Muskingum County, Ohio
National Register of Historic Places in Muskingum County, Ohio